

Events
June 15 – Mozart's Requiem is performed at a memorial service for Joseph Haydn at the Schottenkirche, Vienna.
Stalybridge Old Band formed in the north of England, perhaps the first civilian brass band in the world.

Classical Music
Ludwig van Beethoven
Piano Concerto No.5, Op. 73 ("Emperor")
"Harp" Quartet in E-flat Major, Op. 74
6 Songs, Op. 75
Six variations on an original theme (the Turkish March from The Ruins of Athens) in D major, Op. 76
Fantasia for Piano in G minor, Op. 77
Piano Sonata No. 24 in F-sharp major, Op. 78
Piano Sonata No. 25 in G major, Op. 79
Four Ariettas and a Duet, Op. 82
Egmont, Op .84 (incidental music for the play by Goethe)
Die laute Klage, WoO 135 (or 1815)
Lied aus der Ferne, WoO 137
Der Jüngling in der Fremde, WoO 138
Der Liebende, WoO 139
François-Joseph Gossec – Symphonie à 17 parties
Johann Nepomuk Hummel – Salve Regina, WoO 18
Etienne Mehul – Symphony No. 1 in G minor
Ferdinand Ries
Symphony No. 1 in D major, Op. 23
Clarinet Trio in B-flat major, Op. 28
Clarinet Sonata, Op. 29
String Quartet, Op. 70 No.2
Piano Trio, Op. 28

Carl Maria von Weber 
6 Pièces, Op. 10a
Serenade, J.65
Andante e rondo ongarese, J.79

Opera
Gaspare Spontini – Fernand Cortez

Births
January 20 – Sebastián Iradier, composer (died 1865)
February 3 – Felix Mendelssohn, composer (died 1847)
March 19 – Fredrik Pacius, conductor and composer (died 1891)
March 31 – Otto Lindblad, composer (died 1864)
April 13 – Aleksander Mirecki, violinist (died 1882)
August 6 – Alfred Tennyson, lyricist and poet (died 1892)
August 21 – Hanna Brooman, composer, translator and educator (died 1887) 
August 30 – Adolf Friedrich Hesse, composer (died 1863) 
October 2 – Anton Emil Titl, composer (died 1882) 
October 12 – John Liptrot Hatton, composer, conductor, pianist and singer (died 1886)
October 15 – Aleksey Koltsov, lyricist and poet (died 1842)
October 21 – Daniel Friedrich Eduard Wilsing, composer (died 1893)
October 22 – Federico Ricci, opera composer (died 1877)
November 16 – Leopoldine Blahetka, pianist and composer (died 1885)
November 26 – Auguste-François Morel, composer (died 1881)

Deaths
January 29 – Luigi Antonio Sabbatini, composer and music theorist (born 1732)
February – Francesco Azopardi, composer (born 1748)
March 7 – Johann Georg Albrechtsberger, organist, composer and music teacher (born 1736)
April 17 – Johann Christian Kittel, organist and composer (born 1732)
April 18 – Birgitte Winther, opera singer (born 1751)
May 1 – Gottlieb Konrad Pfeffel, librettist and writer (born 1736)
May 31 – Joseph Haydn, composer (born 1732)
July 2 or (3) – Joseph Quesnel, composer and writer (born 1746)
July 24 – Johann Gottfried Eckard, pianist and composer (born 1735)
September 21 – Alexander Reinagle, composer, organist, and theater musician (born 1736)
December 31 – Franz Ignaz Beck, composer (born 1734) 

 
19th century in music
Music by year